Kelty is a manufacturer of high-end backpacks, tents, and sleeping bags owned by Exxel Outdoors, LLC. The business is based in Boulder, Colorado.

History 
The company was started in 1952 by Asher "Dick" Kelty (September 13, 1919 – January 12, 2004), who was one of the first gear designers to produce and market an external-frame backpack designed specifically for civilian use. He is considered to be the inventor of the aluminum-framed backpack. Kelty was also the provider of gear in the 1970s cult classic TV series The Land Of The Lost.

Products 
Kelty products are widely sold by large outdoor outfitters such as Eastern Mountain Sports and REI, Kelty is one of a few companies that still specializes in external-frame backpacks for outdoors use. Kelty released approximately 170 products / 253 models. Tent is one of core products of Kelty. Kelty tent made by high-quality materials. The tent fabric is made of Polyester which is more long-lasting than Nylon and the poles are made of DAC aluminum.

Product categories 
 Backpacks
 Outdoor gear
 Sleep solution
 Tents and shelters
 Outdoor kids' items
 Camp furniture

Competing Company 
Dick Kelty's son, Richard Kelty, became one of the founders of Sierra West, a competing company.

See also 

 Eastern Mountain Sports
 REI

References

External links
Kelty official company

American companies established in 1952
Camping equipment manufacturers
Manufacturing companies based in Boulder, Colorado
Cooler manufacturers